Bembry is a surname. Notable people with the surname include:

Chental-Song Bembry (born 1996), American author, illustrator, and motivational speaker
DeAndre' Bembry (born 1994), American basketball player
Leonard Bembry (born 1947), American politician